Aşağı Güzdək (also, Ashaghy Guzdak and Verkhniy Guzdak) is a village and municipality in the Absheron District of Azerbaijan.  It has a population of 2,755.

References

External links

Populated places in Absheron District